Veenstra is a Dutch (originally Frisian) toponymic surname equivalent to the surnames Van der Veen and Van Veen. Notable people with the surname include:

Bas Veenstra (born 1995), Dutch basketball player
Erin Veenstra (born 1978), American cyclist
Herman Veenstra (1911–2004), Dutch water polo player
Johan Veenstra (born 1946), Dutch writer
Johanna Veenstra (1894–1933), American missionary
Kenneth Veenstra (born 1939), American politician
Michiel Veenstra (born 1976), Dutch radio personality
Myrna Veenstra (born 1975), Dutch field hockey player
René Veenstra (born 1969), Dutch sociologist 
Richard Veenstra (born 1981), Dutch darts player
Rogier Veenstra (born 1987), Dutch footballer
Tine Veenstra (born 1983), Dutch bobsledder
Wiebren Veenstra (born 1966), Dutch cyclist
Wietse Veenstra (born 1946), Dutch footballer

See also
Veenstra (band), a Brazilian art rock band
Feenstra, variant spelling of the surname

Surnames of Frisian origin

de:Veenstra
nl:Veenstra